A brakeman's cabin (also brakeman's cab) or brakeman's caboose (US) (German: Bremserhaus) was a small one-man compartment at one end of a railway wagon to provide shelter for the brakeman from the weather and in which equipment for manually operating the wagon brake was located. They were built in the days before continuous braking was available and the locomotive brake needed to be augmented by brakemen applying the wagon brakes individually.

History
In the early years of the railway, brakemen just had an open seat. The first cabs appeared around 1880. The number of brakeman's cabs occupied in a given train depended on the conditions of the route and the speed of the train; on some trains all the cabs might be occupied. Communication between engine driver and brakemen was by train whistle signals which required the design of the brakeman's cab to be partially open to the elements.

Risk
Working in brakeman's cabins was dangerous, especially in winter because the cabins were unheated and draughty and there was little room to move around and keep warm. As a result brakemen frequently froze, sometimes even to death, placing the entire train at risk due to lack of braking power.

Decline

Germany
Brakeman's cabins became superfluous with the widespread introduction of compressed air brakes. In Germany, such brakes first appeared on D-Zug (express) trains at the end of the 19th century. The building of brakeman's cabins stopped on German passenger trains in the early 1900s and on goods trains around 1925. Goods wagons with a brakeman's cab were still regularly seen in Germany up to the mid-1970s, especially on Italian goods wagons. With some railway companies, such as the Italian FS and the Swiss SBB, they even lasted until the 1990s.

Gallery

See also 
 Brake van
 Caboose

References

External links
 
 *Entry for "Bremsersitze" in Rölls Enzyklopädie des Eisenbahnwesens (1912)

Rolling stock
Cabooses